Take Me to Your Heart can refer to:

"Take Me to Your Heart" (Bananarama song)
"Take Me to Your Heart" (Rick Astley song)
Take Me to Your Heart (album), an album by Michael Learns to Rock
 "Take Me to Your Heart" (Michael Learns to Rock song), a song by Michael Learns to Rock